Bona AB is a family-owned company founded in 1919. With its headquarters located in Sweden, Bona is now present in more than 70 countries through subsidiaries and country distributors. Bona provides products for the installation, maintenance and renovation of wooden floors throughout their lifetime and also supply UV coatings to leading international producers of wooden floors.

Bona pioneered waterborne finishes starting in 1979, and presented the patent in 1982.

Bona has production facilities in Sweden, Germany, the USA, and China. The American division of Bona AB is located at 24 Inverness Place East, Englewood, Colorado.

History 
The Bona story started in the 1890s, when Wilhelm Edner opened a grocery shop in Malmö, Sweden selling coffee and various household products. The years went by, the business developed and, during the 1910s, floor wax, a completely new product on the Swedish market at the time, came into the picture. In August 1919, Wilhelm Edner registered a company called Aktiebolaget Bona. This is the date that Bona AB, the floor care company, was founded, since then the company has exclusively worked with the treatment of wooden floors.

In 1997, the American division of Bona made a partnership with Orange Glo International (purchased by Church and Dwight in 2006) for their Orange Glo-branded products, such as the Orange Glo Wood Cleaner & Polish, and later the Orange Glo Hardwood Floor Refinisher, followed by other Orange Glo products.

In January 2007, Kerstin Lindell became the president and CEO of the company. The current CEO of Bona AB since 2021 is Pontus Cornelius. Kerstin Lindell shifts her role to the chairman of the board.

In 2012, Bona became the official hardwood floor care sponsor for the NBA.

In April 2015, Bona earned the Asthma and Allergy Friendly Certification for their free & simple hardwood floor cleaner.

Products 
Bona has products and solutions for contractors, homeowners and parquet producers. Their product portfolio is the Bona System.

Contractors 
Renovation with waterborne finishes
Dust-free sanding machines
Ergonomic sanding machines
Silane-based adhesives

Homeowners 
Bona offers a product range for renovation and maintenance adapted for use by end consumers.

Bona Hardwood Floor Cleaner
Bona Laminate Floor Cleaner
Bona Express Disposable Wet Cleaning Pads for Stone, Tile, & Laminate Floors
Bona Premium Spray Mop for Hardwood Floors
Bona Premium Spray Mop for Stone, Tile & Laminate Floors
Bona Clean & Refresh Hardwood Floor Cleaner
Bona Ultimate Hardwood Floor Care Kit
Bona Multi-Surface Floor Care Kit
Bona PowerPlus Hardwood Floor Deep Cleaner
Bona PowerPlus Microfiber Deep Clean Pad
Bona Free & Simple Hardwood Floor Cleaner
Bona Disposable Dusting Cloths
Bona Express Disposable Wet Cleaning Pads for Hardwood Floors
Bona Microfiber Dusting Pad
Bona Microfiber Cleaning Pad
Bona Microfiber Pad Pack
Bona Microfiber Cleaning Cover Twin Pack
Premium Microfiber Mop for Hard Surface Floors
Bona Hardwood Floor Mop Motion
Bona Stone, Tile & Laminate Cleaner
Bona Stone, Tile & Laminate Polish
Bona Polish Remover with Scrubbing Pad
Bona Wood Furniture Polish
Professional Series Natural Oil Floor Cleaner System
Professional Series Natural Oil Floor Cleaner
Bona Pro Series Hardwood Floor Cleaner
Bona Pro Series Hardwood Floor Refresher
Bona Pro Series Hardwood Floor Mop
Bona Pro Series Hardwood Floor Care System
Bona Pro Series Stone, Tile & Laminate Cleaner
Bona Pro Series Stone, Tile & Laminate Refill Cartridge
Bona Pro Series Stone, Tile & Laminate Refresher
Bona Pro Series Stone, Tile & Laminate Gallon Refill
Bona Pro Series Microfiber Pads

Parquet Producers 
Bona is the supplier of UV-coatings to international producers of wooden floors.

References 

Manufacturing companies of Sweden
Companies based in Malmö